Charles Kelleway (25 April 1886 – 16 November 1944) was an Australian cricketer who played in 26 Test matches between 1910 and 1928.

In 1911/12, he played against the MCC touring-team captained by Plum Warner. In the Test-series, he took a total of only 6 wickets at 41.50.  However, in the Triangular tournament of 1912 in England, he was more successful and made 360 runs in Australia's six Tests, with 114 at Manchester and 102 at Lord's, both against South Africa. He also had the best bowling of 5/33 in an innings.

He served as a captain in the Australian Army during World War I and was the first captain of the Australian Imperial Force Touring XI that toured Great Britain in 1919, until he was removed following a dispute.

He died after a long illness in Lindfield, New South Wales.

External links

AIF database entry

1886 births
1944 deaths
Australia Test cricketers
New South Wales cricketers
Australian cricketers
People from Lismore, New South Wales
Cricketers from New South Wales
Australian Imperial Force Touring XI cricketers
Australian military personnel of World War I